Poland competed at the 2005 World Championships in Athletics in Helsinki, Finland, from 6 – 14 August 2005.

Medalists

Results
(q – qualified, NM – no mark, SB – season best)

Men
Track and road events

Field events

1, 2 Because of disqualification of Ivan Tsikhan and Vadim Devyatovskiy, Ziółkowski's place was changed from third to first.

Women 
Track and road events

Field events

Combined events – Heptathlon

Sources 

Nations at the 2005 World Championships in Athletics
World Championships in Athletics
Poland at the World Championships in Athletics